Fondren Lack Mitchell (June 19, 1921 – September 24, 1952) was an American football halfback who played one season with the Miami Seahawks of the All-America Football Conference (AAFC). He was drafted by the Chicago Cardinals of the National Football League (NFL) in the tenth round of the 1943 NFL Draft. He played college football at Florida.

Early years
Mitchell won six individual state prep titles in track and field at Leon High School in Tallahassee, Florida. He won the shot put state title in 1937, 1938 and 1939, the discus state title in 1937 and 1938 and the long jump state title in 1939.

College career
Mitchell lettered for the Florida Gators of the University of Florida from 1940 to 1942.

Professional career
Mitchell was selected by the Chicago Cardinals of the NFL with the 84th pick in the 1943 NFL draft. He later signed with the AAFC's Miami Seahawks on May 18, 1946. He played for the Seahawks in 1946, catching eight passes for 131 yards and rushing for seventeen yards on five attempts. Mitchell also recorded one interception.

Personal life
Mitchell served in the United States Army during World War II.

References

External links
Just Sports Stats

1921 births
1952 deaths
American football halfbacks
American football defensive backs
Florida Gators football players
Miami Seahawks players
United States Army personnel of World War II
Players of American football from Tallahassee, Florida
Leon High School alumni